"Boogie Down" is a 1973 song which was recorded by Eddie Kendricks for Motown Records' Tamla label. The song was co-written by Leonard Caston Jr., Anita Poree and Frank Wilson, the same songwriting team that had composed "Keep on Truckin'", Kendricks' first major hit as a solo artist. Caston and Wilson co-produced the song and the arrangement was handled by Caston, Wilson and David Van De Pitte.

Chart performance
Like "Keep on Truckin'", "Boogie Down" is an up-tempo, disco, dance number that saw heavy rotation in dance clubs. Released as a single from the album of the same name, "Boogie Down" became Kendricks' second consecutive single to top the Billboard's R&B Singles Chart, holding the number one position for three weeks. 

It just missed becoming his second straight #1 on the Billboard Pop Singles Chart, peaking at number two for two straight weeks, behind "Seasons in the Sun" by Terry Jacks.  However, it was Kendricks' second #1 single on the Cash Box Top 100 chart. Billboard ranked it as the #30 Pop single of 1974. Outside the US, it was a Top 40 hit in Britain as well, hitting #39 on the UK Charts.

Personnel
Credits adapted from The Billboard Book of Number One Rhythm & Blues Hits.

Ed Greene – drums
Dean Parks – guitar
Greg Poree – guitar
Gary Coleman – percussion, vibes
King Errisson – congas
James Jamerson – bass
Jerry Peters – organ
Leonard Caston – piano, clavinet, writer, producer
Anita Poree – writer
Frank Wilson – writer, producer

References

1973 singles
1974 singles
Songs written by Frank Wilson (musician)
Tamla Records singles
Songs written by Leonard Caston Jr.
Songs written by Anita Poree
1973 songs
Song recordings produced by Frank Wilson (musician)
Eddie Kendricks songs
Cashbox number-one singles